Eleni Vakalo (1921 – 2001) was a Greek poet, art critic and art historian.

Biography
Eleni Vakalo, née Stavrinou, was born in 1921, in Constantinople, and in 1922 her parents moved to Athens. She studied archaeology at the University of Athens (1940–45) and art history at Sorbonne (1948). In 1944 she married the painter Giorgos Vakalo (1902 – 1991).

Awards
First State Award for Poetry, 1991
Essay Award of the Academy of Athens, 1997
Honorary degree in history-archaeology from the University of Thessaloniki, 1998
Honorary degree from the University of Derby, 2000

Bibliography

Poetry
Theme and Variations (Θέμα και Παραλλαγές), Athens, Icaros, 1945
Recollections from a nightmarish city (Αναμνήσεις από μια εφιαλτική πολιτεία), Athens, 1948
In the form of theorems (Στη μορφή των θεωρημάτων), Athens, 1951
The Forest (Το Δάσος), Athens, Karavia, 1954
Mural (Τοιχογραφία), Athens, The Friends of Literature, 1956
Age's diary (Ημερολόγιο της ηλικίας), Athens, Diphros, 1958
Description of the body (Περιγραφή του σώματος), Athens, Diphros, 1959
The Concept of blind people (Η Έννοια των τυφλών), Athens, 1962
The Way of being in danger (Ο Τρόπος να Κινδυνεύομε), Athens, 1966
Genealogy/Γενεαλογία (Greek-English edition, English translation by Paul Merchant), The Rougemont Press, 1971
Of the World (Του Κόσμου), Athens, Kedros, 1978
The foolishness of Ma Rodalina (Οι παλάβρες της Κυρά-Ροδαλίνας), Athens, Ypsilon, 1984
Events and Stories of Ma Rodalina (Γεγονότα και Ιστορίες της Κυρά-Ροδαλίνας), Athens, 1990
The Other Face of the Thing. Poetry 1954–1994 (Το Άλλο του Πράγματος. Ποίηση 1954–1994), Athens, Nepheli, 1995
Selected poems (Επιλεγόμενα), Athens, Nepheli, 1997

Art theory
Introduction to Topics of Painting (Εισαγωγή σε Θέματα Ζωγραφικής), Athens, Athens School of Fine Arts, 1960
12 Lectures on Modern Art (12 Μαθήματα για τη Σύγχρονη Τέχνη), Athens, "Hour", Centre of Art and Culture, 1973
The Concept of Forms. Reading Art (Η Έννοια των Μορφών. Ανάγνωση της Τέχνης), Athens, "Hour", Centre of Art and Culture, 1979
The Face of Post-War Art in Greece (Η Φυσιογνωμία της Μεταπολεμικής Τέχνης στην Ελλάδα, in four volumes), Athens, Kedros, 1980–84
From the Viewer's Side. Essays (Από την Πλευρά του Θεατή. Δοκίμια), Athens, Kedros, 1989
Giorgos Vakalo. The charm of writing. (Γιώργος Βακαλό. Το θέλγητρο της γραφής), Athens, "New Forms" Gallery, 1994
Visual Arts Criticism (1950–1974) (Κριτική Εικαστικών Τεχνών (1950–1974), in two volumes), Athens, Kedros, 1996

References

External links
Monogramma, ERT Archives
Nychterinos Episkeptis, Ert Archives

1921 births
2001 deaths
Modern Greek-language writers
Modern Greek poets
Greek women poets
Greek art critics
Women art critics
Emigrants from the Ottoman Empire to Greece
Writers from Athens
Constantinopolitan Greeks
Writers from Istanbul